Muhammad Rizwan Sr. (born 31 December 1989) is a Pakistani field hockey player who plays as a midfielder for Dutch club Schaerweijde and the Pakistan national team.

Club career
Rizwan Sr. plays club hockey in the Netherlands since 2012 when he was signed by Oranje Zwart. After Oranje Zwart merged in 2016 with EMHC, he started playing for the newly formed club HC Oranje-Rood. After his contract at Oranje-Rood expired in 2019, he joined Schaerweijde.

International career

2012
Rizwan was included in the squad for the 2012 Olympic Games in London, UK. He was in the runners-up squad of Pakistan at 2014 Men's Hockey Champions Trophy. At the 2018 World Cup, Rizwan was the captain of the Pakistan team, but he only played two games because he had to withdraw injured after the game against Malaysia.

See also
Muhammad Rizwan Jr. (born 1991)

References

External links
 

1989 births
Living people
Pakistani male field hockey players
Olympic field hockey players of Pakistan
Male field hockey midfielders
People from Toba Tek Singh District
Asian Games medalists in field hockey
Field hockey players at the 2010 Asian Games
Field hockey players at the 2012 Summer Olympics
Field hockey players at the 2014 Asian Games
Field hockey players at the 2018 Asian Games
Asian Games gold medalists for Pakistan
Asian Games silver medalists for Pakistan
Medalists at the 2010 Asian Games
Medalists at the 2014 Asian Games
2018 Men's Hockey World Cup players
Hockey India League players
Oranje Zwart players
HC Oranje-Rood players
Men's Hoofdklasse Hockey players
21st-century Pakistani people